is a 1949 black-and-white Japanese film directed by Torajiro Saito.

Cast 
 Hibari Misora

See also
 List of films in the public domain in the United States

References

External links 
 

Japanese black-and-white films
1949 films
Films directed by Torajiro Saito
Toei Company films